Oren Aharoni (אורן אהרוני; born November 12, 1973) is an Israeli basketball coach and former basketball player. He played the guard position. Aharoni played in the Israeli Basketball Premier League, and on the Israeli national basketball team.

Biography

Aharoni is 6' 3" (190 cm) tall.

He attended Florida International University for one year ('96). Aharoni played for the Florida International Panthers in his freshman year in 1996-96. He holds the FIU freshman record in three-point field goals (49), and is 4th of all FIU fresmen all time in assists (58), and tied for 8th in steals (31).

Aharoni played in the Israeli Basketball Premier League. Between 1991 and 2007 he played for Israeli teams Hapoel Holon, Ironi Nahariya, Ironi Ramat Gan, Hapoel Eilat, Maccabi Haifa, and Elitzur Givat Shmuel (as captain).

He also played on the Israeli national basketball team. Aharoni played in the 1992 FIBA European Championship for Junior Men, 1994 FIBA European Championship for Men '22 and Under', and 1997 FIBA European Championship for Men.

Aharoni has been Head Coach of the Israeli National Team U16, U18, and U20 Men’s teams since 2009. He has also been General Manager of Maccabi Teddy Tel Aviv Youth Departments since 2011.

References 

1973 births
Living people
FIU Panthers men's basketball players
Hapoel Eilat basketball players
Hapoel Holon players
Ironi Nahariya players
Ironi Ramat Gan players
Israeli basketball coaches
Israeli Basketball Premier League players
Israeli men's basketball players
Maccabi Haifa B.C. players
Sportspeople from Tel Aviv